William Whitford  (1846 – ) was a physician who served as chairman of the Everton F.C. and the Everton Liberal Club. He was a prominent temperance reformer.

Whitford was born in Armagh, Ireland, and was a physician at Queen's University Belfast. He was an advocate of the Irish home rule movement.

References

Everton F.C. directors and chairmen
Irish surgeons
1846 births
Year of death missing